Putkaste is a village in Hiiumaa Parish, Hiiu County in northwestern Estonia.

The population is around 80 citizens.

References

 

Villages in Hiiu County
Kreis Wiek